Edgardo Brittes (born September 30, 1982 in Paraná (Entre Ríos), Argentina) is an Argentine former professional footballer who played as a forward.

Career
Brittes (also known as Indio) began his football career with local side Patronato, helping the club win the 2008 Torneo Argentino B and the 2010 Torneo Argentino A. Brittes moved abroad to play in Bolivia for a brief spell in 2012. He returned to Patronato in July 2012, where he would compete in the 2012–13 Primera B Nacional.

Brittes retired in 2017, last playing for Juventud Unida de Río Cuarto (in the Torneo Federal B).

Teams
 Patronato 2005–2010
 Santamarina 2010–2011
 Libertad 2011
 Real Potosí 2012
 Patronato 2012
 Deportivo Santamarina 2012–2013
 Patronato 2013–2015
 Almagro 2015
 Central Norte 2015
 Juventud Unida 2016

References

External links
 
 

1982 births
Living people
People from Paraná, Entre Ríos
Argentine footballers
Association football forwards
Club y Biblioteca Ramón Santamarina footballers
Libertad de Sunchales footballers
Club Atlético Patronato footballers
Club Real Potosí players
Club Almagro players
Central Norte players
Juventud Unida de Gualeguaychú players
Argentine expatriate footballers
Argentine expatriate sportspeople in Bolivia
Expatriate footballers in Bolivia
Sportspeople from Entre Ríos Province